Pentagon Transit Center is a split platform station on the Washington Metro located adjacent to The Pentagon in Arlington, Virginia. The station was opened on July 1, 1977, and is operated by the Washington Metropolitan Area Transit Authority. Providing service for both the Blue and Yellow Lines, the station is where the two lines diverge and thus acts as a transfer point. Northbound, the Blue Line continues through Virginia and the Yellow Line crosses the Potomac River into the District of Columbia.

Bus service
Pentagon station is also a major bus hub in northern Virginia.  The current bus facility opened in 2001 as part of the Pentagon Renovation Program.

 Arlington Transit: 42, 87, 87A, 87P, 87X
 DASH: 35, 103, 104
 Fairfax Connector: 306, 393, 394, 395, 599, 698, 834, 835
 Metrobus: 7A, 7C, 7M, 7P, 8S, 8W, 10A, 10E, 10N, 16A, 16C, 16E, 16L, 17B, 17G, 17K, 17L, 17M, 18G, 18J, 18P, 21C, 21D, 22A, 22C, 22F, 28F, 29G
 Loudoun County Transit: 282, 482, 682, 882 
 PRTC OmniRide: 543, 602, 612, 942, D-100, D-200, D-300, L-100, L-200, MC-100, MC-200, RS
 Ride Smart Northern Shenandoah Valley: DC Motorcoach (From Front Royal to D.C.)

Station layout 
The station is located underground, adjacent to The Pentagon, and formerly had a direct (but secure) entrance to the Pentagon and its underground shopping center.  This entrance was closed in 2001 as part of the Pentagon Renovation Program.  Access to the Pentagon is now gained via a new secured entrance facility above ground near the bus depot and the entrances to the subway station.  The new exit features signage displayed at Gallery Place-Chinatown and newer stations.

Pentagon is one of two stations (the other being the Rosslyn station) at which trains going one direction are boarded on a different station level than trains going the other direction, as a way to prevent an at-grade crossing. This is because the Blue and Yellow lines split apart an extremely short distance from the station.

Incidents

2010 

On March 4, 2010, a gunman, identified as John Patrick Bedell, who espoused anti-government views, shot and wounded two Pentagon police officers at a security checkpoint in the Pentagon station. The officers returned fire, striking him in the head. Bedell died the next day, on March 5, 2010.

2021 
At 10:40 a.m. EST, on August 3, 2021, a stabbing occurred, killing officer George Gonzalez and leading to a lockdown of the Pentagon that was later lifted. The perpetrator, 27-year-old Austin William Lanz shot and killed himself using Gonzalez's service weapon. In an apology issued by Lanz's family, they stated that in his final few months, he suffered from "many mental health challenges". There was a warrant out for Lanz's arrest due to an incident months earlier, in which Lanz broke into a Georgia home with a crowbar.

Notable places nearby 
 Pentagon Memorial
 United States Air Force Memorial

References

External links
 

 Archived The Schumin Web Transit Center: Pentagon Station

Stations on the Blue Line (Washington Metro)
The Pentagon
Transportation in Arlington County, Virginia
Washington Metro stations in Virginia
Stations on the Yellow Line (Washington Metro)
Railway stations in the United States opened in 1977
1977 establishments in Virginia
Railway stations located underground in Virginia